The twelfth series of the British medical drama television series Holby City commenced airing in the United Kingdom on BBC One on 20 October 2009. The series deals with the repercussions of the death of ward sister Faye Byrne's son Archie, including the resignation of consultant Connie Beauchamp and the return of former registrar Thandie Abebe-Griffin. It also focuses on staff members' romantic and family lives. F1 Oliver Valentine becomes romantically involved with registrar Jac Naylor and ward sister Daisha Anderson, and his sister Penny embarks on a secret romance with a heart transplant patient. Consultant Linden Cullen is reunited with his estranged daughter Holly, nurse Donna Jackson decides to adopt her half-niece Mia, sister Chrissie Williams gives birth to a son, Daniel, and Faye becomes pregnant by her estranged husband Joseph. The series includes a crossover episode with sister show Casualty and it also has the highest number of episodes to date, as the series contains a small number of episodes which air during the same week.

The series began with 15 roles receiving star billing. Executive producer Tony McHale and actresses Rebecca Grant and Phoebe Thomas announced their intentions to leave the show during the course of the year. Actresses Leslie Ash, Amanda Mealing and Tina Hobley took several-month breaks from filming, and actresses Ginny Holder and Anna-Louise Plowman reprised their roles as Thandie Abebe-Griffin and Annalese Carson respectively. The series received mixed to negative reviews from critics. It was criticised as presenting an inaccurate portrayal of real hospital life, and deemed a soap opera rather than a drama series by former Holby City writer Peter Jukes. It attained strong ratings, however, and was regularly the most-watched show in the 8 pm Tuesday timeslot, frequently drawing a quarter of the audience share.

Episodes

Production

Crew and scheduling
The series was produced by the BBC and aired on BBC One in the United Kingdom. In December 2009, executive producer and series co-creator Tony McHale announced his intention to stand down, after four years producing the show. McHale was the first British writer ever to become the showrunner of a major prime-time drama, and the BBC's controller of drama John Yorke praised him for his success. McHale stated: "I've had a terrific four years on Holby and am thrilled with what we've achieved. [...] I know the show will go on from strength to strength." McHale was succeeded as executive producer by Belinda Campbell, and as lead writer by Justin Young, who intends to introduce a more writer-led commissioning process from series thirteen onwards. Young aims for writers to create more of the theme and story of their episodes than was previously the case. The series featured a number of different directors and writers. Each director worked on at least two episodes, except Robert Del Maestro and Edward Bazalgette, who directed one episode each. Dominic Keavey was the series' most frequent director, working on eight episodes. Graham Mitchell was the series' most frequent writer, writing six episodes.

Holby City twelfth series aired in the 8 pm timeslot on Tuesdays across the United Kingdom, except in Scotland, where the series has no fixed timeslot. As a result, several episodes originally aired on BBC Scotland before their broadcast in the rest of the United Kingdom. The episode "Take No Prisoners" originally aired on 10 May 2010 on BBC Scotland. In the rest of the United Kingdom, the episode was rescheduled from 11 to 12 May 2010 due to extended news coverage of the 2010 UK General Election, and the BBC received 83 complaints over the rescheduling. Episodes were repeated on BBC One on the Monday morning following their original broadcast.

Music
The series continued the technique of using musical montage or "songtage" segments in each episode, originally introduced by McHale as a means of modernising the programme. The opening episodes alone, "The Hands that Rock the Cradle" parts one and two, utilised "Ben's Song", "Answer", "Angel" and "Dirty Little Secret" by Sarah McLachlan, "Sweet About Me" by Gabriella Cilmi,"Can't Speak French" by Girls Aloud, "Don't Bring Me Down" by Sia, The Blue Danube by Johann Strauss II, "Golden Slippers" by Lester Bradley & Friends and "Svefn-g-englar" by Sigur Rós. Asked whether she felt songtages were appropriate for a serious drama show, series producer Diana Kyle responded: "Yes - sometimes. On a multi-strand series such as Holby, they are an excellent way of telling stories visually - a moment from each - to open or close an episode or create the passing of time in a concise way for the audience." Kris Green of entertainment and media website Digital Spy suggested that the number of songs used per episode could be "very jarring", to which Kyle replied: "We plan to use music carefully in the future - maybe 'songtages', as above - and sourced music within a scene, that is music actually playing in the scene itself, for example on a radio - but less incidental."

Crossovers
Series twelve included a crossover storyline with Holby City sister show Casualty. Holby originally launched as a spin-off from Casualty in 1999, and the two dramas have occasionally crossed over in special episodes broadcast as Casualty@Holby City. A new set of crossover episodes written by Casualty lead writer Mark Catley were planned for February 2010. In the event, however, the episodes which saw Casualty Charlie Fairhead (Derek Thompson) operated on by Holby City Elliot Hope (Paul Bradley) after suffering a heart attack were broadcast as regular Casualty and Holby City episodes, rather than under the Casualty@Holby City title. Casualty series producer Oliver Kent commented that, while it is "fantastic" to be able to produce crossover episodes, they are logistically difficult, as Casualty is filmed in Bristol, while Holby City is filmed in Elstree. In June 2010, Kent announced that the two shows would crossover again in September, for the launch of Casualty 25th series. He explained that Holby City nurse Donna Jackson (Jaye Jacobs) would appear in the first episode of the new season of Casualty, at the bequest of Cately, who again wrote the episode. Kent deemed it unlikely that another Casualty@Holby City episode would be produced in the "foreseeable future", but hoped that characters from the two shows would begin to crossover two or three times a year.

500th episode
On 13 April 2010, Holby City reached its 500th episode with "Bette Davis Eyes", in which Jac (Rosie Marcel) offers to donate a kidney to her mother, who abandoned her as a child, and Chrissie (Tina Hobley) gives birth to a son. Marcel stated that she was "really proud" of the storyline, and grateful for the opportunity to show a different side of her character, explaining: "Everybody always has had their family dragged into things on the show, apart from me. It's actually been five years since I started and now we're finally getting to meet Jac's family. It's exciting." Hobley also enjoyed her storyline, commenting that after Chrissie's first baby died and she then suffered a miscarriage, Chrissie was "due some happiness". Actress Amanda Mealing stated on the show reaching 500 episodes: "It's a huge achievement. Holby always had a good, high standard and that's not easy thing to do when you're on every week for an hour. We're always pushing it and making it better, too. To still be around for the 500th episode is testament to the passion that we all have."

Cast

Overview 
The series began with 15 roles receiving star billing. Amanda Mealing portrayed Connie Beauchamp, a consultant on the cardiothoracic surgery ward, Darwin. Paul Bradley played Elliot Hope, also a cardiothoracic consultant, and Luke Roberts played Joseph Byrne, a registrar on Elliot's firm. Hari Dhillon played consultant general surgeon and Director of Surgery Michael Spence. Hugh Quarshie acted as Ric Griffin, also a consultant on the general surgery ward, Keller. Rosie Marcel portrayed Jac Naylor, a general surgical registrar. Emma Catherwood and James Anderson appeared as Penny and Oliver Valentine, siblings and F1 doctors. Duncan Pow played Linden Cullen, a consultant on the hospital's Acute Assessment Unit. Robert Powell played Mark Williams, the unit's consultant nurse, and Tina Hobley played his daughter, ward sister Chrissie Williams. Patsy Kensit and Rebecca Grant played ward sisters Faye Byrne and Daisha Anderson, and Jaye Jacobs and Phoebe Thomas played staff nurses Donna Jackson and Maria Kendall. 

Two actresses departed during the course of the series, with Grant leaving in March 2010, and Thomas departing during the summer. Kensit, Mealing and Roberts also resigned from the show during its twelfth series, however their characters will not depart until series thirteen. Prior to her resignation, Mealing took a three-month break from the show to spend time with her family and travel to Bangladesh. Hobley took four months maternity leave, which coincided with her character's own maternity leave, and actor Alex Macqueen left his recurring role of anaesthetist Keith Greene, having appeared in Holby City since 2005.

To compensate for the departing characters, several new characters joined the show during the course of the series. After appearing briefly as Chrissie's one-night stand, Bob Barrett became a main cast member playing locum consultant Sacha Levy. Meanwhile, having made a one off appearance as surgeon Greg Douglas in February 2010, Edward MacLiam joined the cast on a permamanet basis from June 2010. Olga Fedori was promoted to the main cast as Frieda Petrenko, while La Charné Jolly was cast as eager new nurse Elizabeth Tait (Holby City). Actors are given the opportunity to shadow real doctors as preparation for their roles. MacLiam spent time with one of Holby City medical advisors, and observed laparoscopic surgery being performed.

The series featured several recurring characters, and numerous guest stars. Ginny Holder reprised her role as Thandie Abebe-Griffin, Ric's wife who last appeared in the show's ninth series. Shelagh McLeod appeared as Judith Marchant, a clinical matron who began a relationship with Mark. Judith was written out of the series in January 2010, but McLeod felt things were left "open ended", suggesting there could be a happy ending for them. She briefly reprised her role in March 2010, as the relationship between Judith and Mark concluded. Leslie Ash played hospital CEO Vanessa Lytton. In December 2009, it was announced that Ash would take a several-month break from the series, returning later in 2010. In June 2010, Anna-Louise Plowman reprised her role as Annalese Carson, wife of Michael Spence. Joshua Bowman had a semi-recurring role, portraying cardiothoracic patient Scott James, who became romantically involved with Penny. Riann Steele appeared as nurse Lauren Minster, and Rick Warden played locum consultant Toby Geddes, described as "hugely irritating" by Scott Matthewman of The Stage. On 29 June 2010, Jane Asher announced that she would be reprising her recurring role as Lady Byrne, mother of Joseph, for a storyline involving Faye's pregnancy.

Main characters 
James Anderson as Oliver Valentine
Bob Barrett as Sacha Levy (from episode 13)
Paul Bradley as Elliot Hope
Emma Catherwood as Penny Valentine
Hari Dhillon as Michael Spence
Olga Fedori as Frieda Petrenko (from episode 20)
Rebecca Grant as Daisha Anderson (until episode 25)
Tina Hobley as Chrissie Williams (until episode 29)
Jaye Jacobs as Donna Jackson
La Charné Jolly as Elizabeth Tait (from episode 35)
Patsy Kensit as Faye Byrne
Rosie Marcel as Jac Naylor
Edward McLiam as Greg Douglas (from episode 20)
Amanda Mealing as Connie Beauchamp
Duncan Pow as Linden Cullen (until episode 55)
Robert Powell as Mark Williams
Hugh Quarshie as Ric Griffin
Luke Roberts as Joseph Byrne
Phoebe Thomas as Maria Kendall (until episode 34)

Recurring characters 
Leslie Ash as Vanessa Lytton (until episode 27)
Roger Barclay as Terence Cunningham
Ginny Holder as Thandie Abebe-Griffin (episodes 3−21)
Andrew Lewis as Paul Rose (until episode 37)
Alex Macqueen as Keith Greene (until episode 42)
Niamh McGrady as Mary-Claire Carter
Shelagh McLeod as Judith Marchant (episodes 1−24)
Alan Morrissey as Nicky van Barr
Anna-Louise Plowman as Annalese Carson (episodes 38−55)
Riann Steele as Lauren Minster (until episode 14)

Guest characters 
Joseph May as George Kerwan (episodes 16−21)
Charlotte Wakefield as Holly Cullen (episodes 5−30)
Rick Warden as Toby Geddes (episodes 20−23)

Reception

Critical response
Critical response to the series was mixed. Jane Simon of the Daily Mirror reviewed the opening episode positively, writing: "We should start a petition to get Holby's creator and exec producer Tony McHale back writing for the show more often, because when he turns in an episode like this one, it's a cracker." However, Simon commented in a later review that Holby is often "Depressing as hell". In October 2009, former Holby City writer Peter Jukes wrote a critical piece for Prospect magazine, contrasting Holby and Casualty negatively with the standard of American television dramas. Jukes wrote that Holby City has become a soap opera, rather than a drama. Tom Sutcliffe of The Independent reviewed a December 2009 episode poorly, finding it "astonishing" that any patients leave Holby General alive, as the staff are "so busy looking stricken or lovelorn at each other". Sutcliffe criticised the themes of "bedside relationship counselling" and "intercollegiate rivalry", and commented: "Anyone in search of a comedy masterclass should watch, but, you know, I don't think this is meant to be a spoof either." Janet Street-Porter, also of The Independent, felt that Holby City had "come to the end of [its] natural life" and should be cancelled. 

In November 2009, Antony Sumara, CEO of the Mid Staffordshire NHS Foundation Hospital Trust, wrote a column criticizing Holby City and Casualty for misrepresenting real hospital life. 

Andrew Billen of The Times reviewed the show's 500th episode, noting that he had lost interest in the series following the departure of Anton Meyer (George Irving) in 2002. He deemed the cast a "bizarre old mix", but concluded: "I could fall in love with this nonsense all over again."

Accolades
During series twelve, Holby City was nominated for the "Best Drama" award at the 2010 Inside Soap Awards, however lost to rival BBC One drama Waterloo Road. It was shortlisted in the "Best Television Continuing Drama" category at the 2010 Writers Guild of Great Britain Awards, with a group nomination for McHale, Young, Catley, Mitchell, Dana Fainaru, Martha Hillier, Chris Murray, David Lawrence, Veronica Henry, Peter Lloyd, Joe Ainsworth, Abi Bown, Andrew Holden, Ian Kershaw, Sebastian Baczkiewicz, Rob Williams, Al Smith, Claire Bennett, Jake Riddell, Nick Warburton, Sonali Bhattacharyya, Rebecca Wojciechowski, Tom Bidwell, Dan Sefton, Paul Mari, Nick Fisher and Sally Abbott. The series was longlisted for the "Best Drama" award at the 2010 National Television Awards, with "Best Drama Performance" nominations for Roberts and Marcel, and a "Best Newcomer" nomination for Fedori, who progressed to the shortlist. It was additionally nominated in the "Best Soap/Continuing Drama" category at the 2011 Broadcast Awards.

Ratings
The twelfth series of Holby City averaged 6.3 million viewers and a 23.1% audience share. The 1 December 2009 episode "And That's What Really Hurts" experienced a drop in ratings to 4.60 million, damaged by ITV airing an extra edition of the soap opera Coronation Street in the same timeslot, winning a 31% audience share and leaving Holby City with an 18% share. Heavy snowfall on 5 January 2010 led to a surge in TV viewing, and the Holby City episode "Talk to Me", which aired that night, received a higher than usual 6.8 million viewers. The series' lowest ratings occurred on 1 June 2010, when Holby City was watched by 3.81 million overnight viewers, adjusted up to 4.28 million in the weekly ratings. The episode, "Taking Over", aired against Britain's Got Talent on ITV, which attained 9.75 million viewers and a 39.2% audience share, leaving Holby City with a 15.1% audience share, down 40% on the channel's average audience share in the timeslot over the previous three months. Holby City was again down in the ratings on 6 July 2010, when the episode "Swimming With Sharks" aired against the first 2010 FIFA World Cup semi-final match on ITV. Holby attained 4.05 million viewers and a 16.9% audience share, while the football was watched by 7.92 million viewers, a 35.3% share.

References

General
 Holby City series 12 at BBC
 Holby City episode summaries at BBC Online
Specific

External links

Holby City series 12 at the Internet Movie Database

12
2009 British television seasons
2010 British television seasons